Jhugian Gulam  is a village in Kapurthala district of Punjab State, India. The village is administrated by a Sarpanch who is an elected representative.

Demography 
According to the 2011 Census of India., Jhugian Gulam has total number of 75 houses and population of 411 of which include 225 males and 186 females. Literacy rate of Jhugian Gulam is 70.19%, lower than state average of 75.84%.  The population of children under the age of 6 years is 52 which is  12.65% of total population of Jhugian Gulam, and child sex ratio is approximately 486, lower than state average of 846.

Population data

Air travel connectivity 
The closest airport to the village is Sri Guru Ram Dass Jee International Airport.

Villages in Kapurthala

References

External links
 Kapurthala Villages List

Villages in Kapurthala district